Rosa Gisella García Rivas (born 21 May 1964) is a retired women's volleyball player from Peru. She was on several Peru national teams at the Summer Olympics in 1984 (finishing 4th) and a silver medalist at the 1988 Seoul Olympics. She was a member of the Peruvian team that won second place in the World Championship in 1982.

García was the national flag bearer at the 2000 Summer Olympics.

References

External links
 
 

1964 births
Living people
Olympic volleyball players of Peru
Volleyball players at the 1984 Summer Olympics
Volleyball players at the 1988 Summer Olympics
Volleyball players at the 2000 Summer Olympics
Olympic silver medalists for Peru
People from Lima
Peruvian women's volleyball players
Olympic medalists in volleyball
Medalists at the 1988 Summer Olympics
Pan American Games medalists in volleyball
Pan American Games silver medalists for Peru
Pan American Games bronze medalists for Peru
Volleyball players at the 1983 Pan American Games
Volleyball players at the 1987 Pan American Games
Volleyball players at the 1991 Pan American Games
Medalists at the 1983 Pan American Games
Medalists at the 1987 Pan American Games
Medalists at the 1991 Pan American Games
20th-century Peruvian women